Dacia Grayber is an American firefighter and politician serving as a member of the Oregon House of Representatives from the 28th district representing Tigard. She previously represented the 35th district from 2021 until 2023.

Education 
Grayber earned a Bachelor of Science degree in homeland security and emergency management from Concordia University.

Career 
Prior to entering politics, Grayber has worked as a firefighter and paramedic for Tualatin Valley Fire and Rescue. Grayber was elected to the Oregon House of Representatives in 2020 with 67.1% of the vote, defeating Republican businessman and engineer Bob Niemeyer. A Democrat, she also won the cross-nomination of the Working Families Party. Grayber was cited as part of a wave of frontline medical workers that were elected to office during the 2020 pandemic.

In June 2021, Grayber assisted Rep. Pam Marsh in passing a $190 million wildfire mitigation bill that established wildfire risk maps, programs to bolster recovery and adapt communities to smoke, and called for changes to buildings within a wildland-urban interface. Grayber also co-sponsored a bill with Rep. Rob Nosse allowing pharmacists to dispense and administer PrEP and PEP, an HIV medication, and giving further authority for them to conduct HIV tests.

In February 2022, Grayber was a sponsor of House Bill 4113, which expanded compensation protection for firefighters from cancer, adding coverage for bladder and female reproductive cancers.

Personal life 
Grayber identifies as a queer woman.

References 

Living people
Year of birth missing (living people)
Concordia University (Oregon) alumni
Democratic Party members of the Oregon House of Representatives
American firefighters
LGBT state legislators in Oregon
Place of birth missing (living people)
Politicians from Tigard, Oregon
21st-century American politicians
21st-century American women politicians